Colin Wells Eglin (14 April 1925 – 29 November 2013) was a South African politician best known for having served as national leader of the opposition from 1977–79 and 1986–87. He represented Sea Point in the South African Parliament from 1958–61 and from 1974–2004. Described by Nelson Mandela as "one of the architects of (South Africa's) democracy", Eglin played a leading role in the drafting of the country's post-apartheid constitution.

Early life, education and military service
Eglin was born in 1925 in Sea Point, the son of Carl August Eglin and his wife, Elsie May Wells. Both of Eglin's parents were South Africans of British descent. He had just turned nine when his father died in July 1934. He later wrote, "He had been ill for a long time, but had been strengthened by a deep and abiding Christian faith - and by the love and care (and equally deep faith) of his wife". His mother died in 1958.

He interrupted his studies in 1943 during the Second World War to join the South African Army. He became a full-time instructor in the anti-aircraft unit in Cape Town. He was then sent to a similar unit in Egypt and transferred to Italy. He took part in the South African assault on Monte Sole, after which the Allies broke through to the plains of Italy. After the War he remained in Italy for nine months, waiting for demobilisation. During this period, he undertook extramural courses in Archaeology and Town Planning.

He graduated from the University of Cape Town with a BSc degree in quantity surveying in 1946.

Early political activity
Eglin was a member of Pinelands Municipal Council from 1951-1954. He was elected as a United Party Cape Province Provincial Councillor in 1954 and served until 1958. He was elected unopposed as MP for the Peninsula constituency in 1958. He left the United Party to become a founder member of the Progressive Party in 1959, losing his seat in the 1961 General Election.

Eglin became the leader of the Progressive Party in February 1971. Eglin was at first outside Parliament but he was elected for the Cape Town seat of Sea Point in the April 1974 General Election, when five other PP candidates joined Helen Suzman in Parliament.

Mounting parliamentary opposition to apartheid
In February 1975, UP liberal leader Harry Schwarz was expelled from the party along with several others, who formed the Reform Party. The two parties, which shared an anti-apartheid ideology, entered into negotiations to merge, which resulted in the creation of the Progressive Reform Party in July 1975. Eglin was elected leader after Schwarz agreed not to stand for the leadership and was appointed Chairman of the National Executive. He became leader of the Progressive Federal Party in 1977, following a merger with the Committee for United Opposition that had also broken away from the United Party. Eglin was the leader of the official Opposition 1977-79. He was replaced as leader by Frederik van Zyl Slabbert in 1979, when Eglin became Shadow Foreign Minister, a post he would hold until 1986.

From 1986-88 Eglin was again party leader, following the resignation of Slabbert. He was official Opposition leader until 1987, when the right-wing Conservative Party became the official opposition party. Zach de Beer took over as leader of the Progressive Federal Party in 1988. The party merged with other groups to become the Democratic Party in 1989 and then the Democratic Alliance in 2000.

Eglin continued to serve in the segregated House of Assembly until it was abolished in 1994 and then in the multi-racial National Assembly in the Parliament of South Africa until he retired in 2004.

Honours
Colin Eglin was made an Officer of the Order of the Disa in 2005. He was awarded the Order of the Baobab, Category II (Silver), in April 2013.

Death
Eglin died on 29 November 2013 when he had a cardiac arrest at the age of 88.

Autobiography
He wrote an autobiography titled Crossing the Borders of Power.

References

Sources
 The International Who's Who 2006 (Routledge 2006)
 UCT News, Alumni Magazine, 2007

1925 births
2013 deaths
20th-century South African politicians
Politicians from Cape Town
White South African anti-apartheid activists
South African people of British descent
University of Cape Town alumni
United Party (South Africa) politicians
Progressive Party (South Africa) politicians
Progressive Reform Party (South Africa) politicians
Progressive Federal Party politicians
Democratic Party (South Africa) politicians
Democratic Alliance (South Africa) politicians
Members of the National Assembly of South Africa
South African military personnel of World War II
Members of the House of Assembly (South Africa)
Order of the Baobab